Lophoproctidae is a family of millipedes in the order Polyxenida containing approximately 65 species in 6 genera.

Description

Lophoproctids are distinguished by a soft body, bearing bristles at the posterior end of each diplosegment; they are blind and generally lack pigmentation. Individuals are small, ranging in size from 1.2 to 4.2 mm. Adults have 13 pairs of legs with internal leg buds, except for those in one species (Lophoturus madecassus), which have only 11 pairs of legs.

Genera
As of 2017, the family contains the following genera:

Alloproctoides Marquet & Condé 1950
Ancistroxenus Schubart 1947
Lophoproctinus Silvestri 1948
Lophoproctus Pocock 1894
Lophoturus Brölemann 1931
Plesioproctus Condé 1964

References 

Polyxenida
Millipede families
Taxa named by Filippo Silvestri